Majhi (Shahmukhi:  Gurmukhi) is the standard dialect of Punjabi and is spoken in the Majha region of the Punjab. The two most important cities in this area are Lahore and Amritsar.

Notable features

- Use of 'ḍéa' (ਡਿਆ/) in continuous tenses:

- Alternate auxiliary verbs

'Han' (ਹਨ/) is never used in spoken Majhi, 'Ne' or 'San' (ਨੇ ,ਸਨ/) is used instead. E.g. Oh karde ne (ਉਹ ਕਰਦੇ ਨੇ / )

First person singular 'ã' or 'Je' (ਵਾਂ/ਆਂ, ਜੇ/ ) is used. E.g. Mɛ̃ karnã, Mɛ̃ karna waañ (ਮੈਂ ਕਰਨਾਂ / ਮੈਂ ਕਰਨਾ ਵਾਂ / )

Third person singular 'ee' or 'ae' (ਈ/ਵੇ , ਏ / ) is used. E.g. Oh karda ee (ਉਹ ਕਰਦਾ ਈ / ) (ਓਹ ਕਰਦਾ ਵੇ/ਏ)

Sometimes when people speak fast 'ਅਸੀ-asi' is pronounced as 'ਅਹੀ/ਅਹੀਂ- ahi' in majhi Punjabi (in majhi speaking area) and 'SaaDa' as 'haaDa' but not always. This is more common in Indian majhi speaking areas and less in the Pakistan Punjabi majha area (but it is used in majhi and some people speak majhi without using 'ahi' or 'haada' and they pronounce as 'asi' or 'Saada'. 

'ਹੈਗਾ ਸੀ'/ਹੈ ਸੀ (haiga si/hai si) is used instead of 'Sīgā', 'ਸੀਗਾ' in pure majhi dialect. 

In majhi Punjabi - 'Yours-ਤੁਆਡਾ/ਤਵਾਡਾ/ਤਾਡਾ/ਤੁਹਾਡਾ' (tuaada/tavaada/taada/tuhaada)

Examples of majhi:-(1) ਤੂੰ ਜਾਂਦਾ ਸੈਂ (توں جاندا سیں)- Tuñ jaanda saiñ, (2) ਮੈਂ ਪਹਿਲੋਂ ਈ ਆਖਦਾ ਸਾਂ (میں پہیلوں ای آکھدا ساں) - Main pehlo e aakhda saañ, (3) ਓਦਣ ਭਰਜਾਈ ਕਿੱਥੇ ਸਣ/ਸਨ (اودن بھرجائی کتھے سن) - ohdan bharjaee kithe san

'ਐਂਜ' (ainj-ainve), 'ਉਂਜ' (unj-oveñ), 'ਕੈਂਜ' (kinj-kiveñ), 'ਜੈਂਜ' (jainj-jiveñ) is ninety five percent majhi Punjabi's use instead of ਐਦਾਂ (aidañ), ਓਦਾਂ (odaañ), ਕਿੱਦਾ (kiddañ), ਜਿੱਦਾਂ (jiddañ) is not commonly used in majhi Punjabi.

- Sporadic use of na- verb ending instead of da- ending 

- Absent subject realised in auxiliary verb

ਕੀ ਕੀਤਾ ਈ  : What have you (sing.) done?

ਕੀ ਕੀਤਾ ਜੇ : What have you (sing. formal or plu.) done?

ਕੀ ਕੀਤਾ ਸੂ : What has he/she done?

ਕੀ ਕੀਤਾ ਨੇ : What have they done?

ਲੜਾਈ ਕੀਤੀ ਸਾਈ : You (sing.) made a fight.

ਲੜਾਈ ਕੀਤੀ ਸਾਜੇ : You (sing. formal or plu.) made a fight

ਲੜਾਈ ਕੀਤੀ ਸਾਸੂ : He/She made a fight.

ਲੜਾਈ ਕੀਤੀ ਸਨ ਨੇ: They made a fight.

References 

Punjabi dialects
Languages of India
Languages of Punjab, India
Languages of Punjab, Pakistan